Vertigo ovata, common name the ovate vertigo, is a species of minute, air-breathing land snail, a terrestrial pulmonate gastropod mollusk in the family Vertiginidae, the whorl snails.

Description
The length of the shell attains 2.3 mm, its diameter 1.4 mm.

The brown shell is dextral and subovate. Its apex is obtuse. The shell contains five glabrous whorls. The suture is not very deeply impressed. The body whorl is indented near and upon the outer lip. The aperture is semioval. The outer lip is five-toothed, of which three are situated on the transverse portion of the lip, parallel to each other, equidistant. The superior
and inferior ones are small, the latter sometimes obsolete, the intermediate one lamelliform, prominent. The two others are situated on the columella, approximate, extending at right angles to the three preceding ones, the superior one oblique and smaller.  The outer lip is reflected but not flattened, bidentate, the teeth lamelliform and prominent. The umbilicus is distinct.

Distribution 
This species is endemic to and widely spread in the United States, occurring in:
 Texas, USA.

References

 Calkins, W.W. (1880). Description and figure of a new species of Zonites from Illinois. The Valley Naturalist, 2(1): 53.
  Cockerell, T. D. A. (1891). New forms of American Mollusca. Zoe. 2(1): 18.
 Barker, G. M. (1999). Naturalised terrestrial Stylommatophora (Mollusca: Gastropoda). Fauna of New Zealand 38: 1-254
 Rosenberg, G. & Muratov, I. V. (2006). Status report on the terrestrial Mollusca of Jamaica. Proceedings of the Academy of Natural Sciences of Philadelphia. 155: 117-161; Erratum: 156: 401 (2007).
 Spencer, H.G., Marshall, B.A. & Willan, R.C. (2009). Checklist of New Zealand living Mollusca. pp 196–219 in Gordon, D.P. (ed.) New Zealand inventory of biodiversity. Volume one. Kingdom Animalia: Radiata, Lophotrochozoa, Deuterostomia. Canterbury University Press, Christchurch.
 Charles, L. (2016). Inventaire de mollusques terrestres de Guadeloupe, Petites Antilles: données préliminaires. Journal MalaCo. 12: 47-56.

External links
 Say, T. 1822. Description of univalve terrestrial and fluviatile shells of the United States. Journal of the Academy of Natural Sciences of Philadelphia 2(2): 370-381
  Adams, C. B. (1849). Descriptions of supposed new Helicidae from Jamaica (Cont.). Contributions to Conchology. 3: 33-38
 Pilsbry, H. A. (1900). Land shells from Rejectamenta of the Rio Grande at Mesilla, New Mexico, and of the Gallinas R. at Las Vegas, N. M. The Nautilus. 14(1): 9-10.
 Frierson, L. S. (1900). An hour on the great raft. The Nautilus. 14(6): 67-69
  https://www.biodiversitylibrary.org/page/1743664
 Webster, G. W. (1892). Florida helices. The Nautilus. 15(10): 119
  Clapp, G. H. (1920). Vertigo ovata and V. hebardi in Florida. The Nautilus. 33(4): 141

ovata
Molluscs of the United States
Gastropods described in 1822
Taxonomy articles created by Polbot